Alteribacillus iranensis is a Gram-positive and moderately halophilic bacterium from the genus of Alteribacillus which has been isolated from mud from the Aran-Bidgol Lake in Iran.

References

External links
Type strain of Alteribacillus iranensis at BacDive -  the Bacterial Diversity Metadatabase

Bacillaceae
Bacteria described in 2016